is the 10th album of Zard and was released on January 28, 2004 under B-Gram Records label.

Charting performance
The album reached #2 rank first week. It charted for 20 weeks and sold more than 200,000 copies. The album was certified platinum in 2011.

Track listing
All lyrics written by Izumi Sakai.

In media
Ashita wo Yume Mite: ending theme for anime television series Detective Conan
Sawayaka na Kimi no Kimochi: commercial song for Kao Corporation
Hitomi Tojite: theme song for Fuji TV program "Sport!"
Tomatteita Tokei ga Ima Ugokidashita: theme song for drama "Igiari! Onna Bengoushi Ookano Rie"

References

Zard albums
2004 albums
Being Inc. albums
Japanese-language albums